The 2009 New York Mets season was a season in American baseball. It was the franchise's 48th season, and the team's first year at Citi Field, which opened on April 13 against the San Diego Padres.  The Mets finished with a 70–92 record, as the season was plagued by many injuries.

Offseason
Looking to improve the bullpen after the struggles of the 2008 season, the Mets signed closer Francisco Rodríguez to a three-year, $37 million contract on December 10, 2008.  Immediately after, the team acquired reliever J. J. Putz from the Seattle Mariners in a three team trade involving the Mariners and the Cleveland Indians, giving the Mets a setup man for Rodriguez. New York shipped reliever Aaron Heilman, outfielder Endy Chávez, pitcher Jason Vargas and three minor leaguers to Seattle for Putz, center fielder Jeremy Reed and reliever Sean Green, while Mets reliever Joe Smith was acquired by Cleveland.

On December 12 the Mets traded Scott Schoeneweis to the Arizona Diamondbacks for Connor Robertson. On January 12, the Mets signed RHP Tim Redding to a one-year contract. The Mets signed Alex Cora to a one-year $2 million contract. The Mets signed Freddy García and Rob Mackowiak to minor league deals.  Garcia's contract, which was full of incentives, could have reached $8 million if he reached the major league roster. On April 3, 2009, the Mets signed outfielder Gary Sheffield after being released by the Detroit Tigers.

Roster

Regular season

The Mets opened up the season in Cincinnati against the Reds on April 6. The Mets collected the victory, improving their win–loss record on opening day. The first home game at Citi Field was on April 13, 2009 against the San Diego Padres, who spoiled the opener with a 6–5 win against the Mets. In that game, Jody Gerut of the Padres became the first player to open a new ballpark with a leadoff home run.

On April 17, Gary Sheffield hit his 500th home run against the Milwaukee Brewers. On May 10, José Reyes stole his 300th base against the Pittsburgh Pirates. Despite an injury depleted roster, the Mets finished May with a 19–9 record and trailed the Philadelphia Phillies by a half game for the NL East lead.

After finishing April and May with a combined record of 28–21, injuries hurt the Mets in June and they went 9–18, their worst month since September 2003, but lost only  games in the standings, as the Phillies were having their own struggles. Injuries continued to hurt them Mets in July, as they went 12–14, quickly falling to 4th place in the National League East and out of playoff contention.

On July 10, the Mets sent outfielder Ryan Church to the Atlanta Braves for outfielder Jeff Francoeur.

However, the Mets did set a team record during the 2009 season. They had a team-record 10 hits in the fourth inning on August 18 against the Atlanta Braves. They scored eight runs in that inning, on their way to a 9–4 victory.

On August 23, the Mets became the first team in National League history to fall victim to a game-ending unassisted triple play, turned by Eric Bruntlett of the Philadelphia Phillies at Citi Field in the bottom of the 9th inning.

The 2009 Mets season will be remembered as a season marred by injuries. On August 25, it was announced that ace Johan Santana would undergo season-ending elbow surgery on his pitching elbow, and was added to the long list of injured players. Including Santana, the Mets' had 20 players see time on the Disabled list at some point during the 2009 season, including David Wright, John Maine, Jon Niese, Fernando Nieve, J. J. Putz, Billy Wagner, Brian Schneider, Carlos Delgado, Ángel Pagán, Gary Sheffield, Óliver Pérez, Ryan Church, Ramón Martínez, Jose Reyes, Alex Cora, Carlos Beltrán, and Fernando Martinez. Mets players spent more than 1,480 days in the Disabled list in 2009, more than any other team in the majors. However, second-half turnarounds of Francoeur and Daniel Murphy helped the Mets finish the season with the best batting average in the National League, tied with the Los Angeles Dodgers.

On August 25 the Mets traded former all-star closer Billy Wagner to the Boston Red Sox for minor league outfielder Chris Carter and minor league first baseman Eddie Loria.

Pat Misch earned his 1st Major League Baseball win on September 3 in his 12th start.

Season standings

Record vs. opponents

Game log 

|- bgcolor="ffbbbb"
|- align="center" bgcolor="bbffbb"
| 1 || April 6 || @ Reds || 2–1 || Santana (1–0) || Harang (0–1) || Rodríguez (1) || 42,177 || 1–0
|- align="center" bgcolor="bbffbb"
| 2 || April 8 || @ Reds || 9–7 || Pelfrey (1–0) || Vólquez (0–1) || Rodríguez (2) || 13,568 || 2–0
|- align="center" bgcolor="ffbbbb"
| 3 || April 9 || @ Reds || 8–6 || Arroyo (1–0) || Pérez (0–1) || Cordero (1) || 17,837 || 2–1
|- align="center" bgcolor="ffbbbb"
| 4 || April 10 || @ Marlins || 5–4 || Lindstrom (1–0) || Feliciano (0–1) || || 24,070 || 2–2
|- align="center" bgcolor="bbffbb"
| 5 || April 11 || @ Marlins || 8–4 || Hernández (1–0) || Nolasco (1–1) || || 39,412 || 3–2
|- align="center" bgcolor="ffbbbb"
| 6 || April 12 || @ Marlins || 2–1 || Johnson (2–0) || Santana (1–1) || || 18,109 || 3–3
|- align="center" bgcolor="ffbbbb"
| 7 || April 13 || Padres || 6–5 || Mujica (1–1) || Stokes (0–1) || Bell (4) || 41,007 || 3–4
|- align="center" bgcolor="bbffbb"
| 8 || April 15 || Padres || 7–2 || Pérez (1–1) || Correia (0–1) || || 35,581 || 4–4
|- align="center" bgcolor="ffbbbb"
| 9 || April 16 || Padres || 6–5 || Peavy (2–1) || Maine (0–1) || Bell (5) || 35,985 || 4–5
|- align="center" bgcolor="bbffbb"
| 10 || April 17 || Brewers || 5–4 || Putz (1–0) || McClung (0–1) || || 36,436 || 5–5
|- align="center" bgcolor="bbffbb"
| 11 || April 18 || Brewers || 1–0 || Santana (2–1) || Villanueva (1–2) || Rodríguez (3) || 36,312 || 6–5
|- align="center" bgcolor="ffbbbb"
| 12 || April 19 || Brewers || 4–2 || Suppan (1–2) || Figueroa (0–1) || Coffey (1) || 36,124 || 6–6
|- align="center" bgcolor="ffbbbb"
| 13 || April 21 || @ Cardinals || 6–4 || Motte (1–1) || Putz (1–1) || Franklin (3) || 35,506 || 6–7
|- align="center" bgcolor="ffbbbb"
| 14 || April 22 || @ Cardinals || 5–2 || Piñeiro (3–0) || Maine (0–2) || Franklin (4) || 35,622 || 6–8
|- align="center" bgcolor="ffbbbb"
| 15 || April 23 || @ Cardinals || 12–8 || Lohse (3–0) || Hernández (1–1) || || 38,522 || 6–9
|- align="center" bgcolor="bbffbb"
| 16 || April 24 || Nationals || 4–3 || Santana (3–1) || Olsen (0–3) || Rodríguez (4) || 40,522 || 7–9
|- align="center" bgcolor="bbffbb"
| 17 || April 25 || Nationals || 8–2 || Pelfrey (2–0) || Cabrera (0–2) || || 39,960 || 8–9
|- align="center" bgcolor="ffbbbb"
| 18 || April 26 || Nationals || 8–1 || Zimmermann (2–0) || Pérez (1–2) || || 40,023 || 8–10
|- align="center" bgcolor="bbffbb"
| 19 || April 27 || Marlins || 7–1 || Maine (1–2) || Sánchez (1–2) || || 38,573 || 9–10
|- align="center" bgcolor="ffbbbb"
| 20 || April 28 || Marlins || 7–4 || Badenhop (1–0) || Green (0–1) || Lindstrom (4) || 38,546 || 9–11
|- align="center" bgcolor="ffbbbb"
| 21 || April 29 || Marlins || 4–3 || Pinto (1–0) || Putz (1–2) || Lindstrom (5) || 39,339 || 9–12
|-

|- bgcolor="ffbbbb"
|- align="center" bgcolor="bbffbb"
| 22 || May 1 || @ Phillies || 7–4 || Pelfrey (3–0) || Park (0–1) || Rodríguez (5) || 44,773 || 10–12
|- align="center" bgcolor="ffbbbb"
| 23 || May 2 || @ Phillies || 6 – 5 (10) || Taschner (1–0) || Green (0–2) || || 45,069 || 10–13
|- align="center" bgcolor="bbbbbb"
| || May 3 || @ Phillies || colspan=6 |Postponed
|- align="center" bgcolor="bbffbb"
| 24 || May 4 || @ Braves || 6–4 || Maine (2–2) || Vázquez (2–3) || Rodríguez (6) || 19,132 || 11–13
|- align="center" bgcolor="bbffbb"
| 25 || May 5 || @ Braves || 4–3 || Hernández (2–1) || Kawakami (1–4) || Rodríguez (7) || 21,049 || 12–13
|- align="center" bgcolor="bbffbb"
| 26 || May 6 || Phillies || 1–0 || Santana (4–1) || Eyre (0–1) || Rodríguez (8) || 37,600 || 13–13
|- align="center" bgcolor="bbffbb"
| 27 || May 7 || Phillies || 7–5 || Pelfrey (4–0) || Moyer (3–2) || Rodríguez (9) || 37,295 || 14–13
|- align="center" bgcolor="bbffbb"
| 28 || May 8 || Pirates || 7–3 || Parnell (1–0) || Yates (0–2) || || 38,496 || 15–13
|- align="center" bgcolor="bbffbb"
| 29 || May 9 || Pirates || 10–1 || Maine (3–2) || Maholm (3–1) || || 39,769 || 16–13
|- align="center" bgcolor="bbffbb"
| 30 || May 10 || Pirates || 8–4 || Hernández (3–1) || Snell (1–5) || || 39,871 || 17–13
|- align="center" bgcolor="ffbbbb"
| 31 || May 11 || Braves || 8–3 || Lowe (5–1) || Santana (4–2) || || 40,497 || 17–14
|- align="center" bgcolor="bbffbb"
| 32 || May 12 || Braves || 4 – 3 (10) || Rodríguez (1–0) || Bennett (0–1) || || 39,408 || 18–14
|- align="center" bgcolor="ffbbbb"
| 33 || May 13 || Braves || 8 – 7 (12) || Bennett (1–1) || Takahashi (0–1) || González (6) || 40,555 || 18–15
|- align="center" bgcolor="bbffbb"
| 34 || May 14 || @ Giants || 7–4 || Parnell (2–0) || Wilson (2–1) || Rodríguez (10) || 30,154 || 19–15
|- align="center" bgcolor="bbffbb"
| 35 || May 15 || @ Giants || 8–6 || Stokes (1–1) || Wilson (2–2) || Rodríguez (11) || 41,684 || 20–15
|- align="center" bgcolor="bbffbb"
| 36 || May 16 || @ Giants || 9–6 || Santana (5–2) || Johnson (3–4) || Putz (1) || 41,336 || 21–15
|- align="center" bgcolor="ffbbbb"
| 37 || May 17 || @ Giants || 2–0 || Cain (4–1) || Pelfrey (4–1) || Wilson (9) || 43,012 || 21–16
|- align="center" bgcolor="ffbbbb"
| 38 || May 18 || @ Dodgers || 3 – 2 (11) || Troncoso (1–0) || Stokes (1–2) || || 37,136 || 21–17
|- align="center" bgcolor="ffbbbb"
| 39 || May 19 || @ Dodgers || 5–3 || Billingsley (6–1) || Maine (3–3) || Broxton (10) || 37,857 || 21–18
|- align="center" bgcolor="ffbbbb"
| 40 || May 20 || @ Dodgers || 2–1 || Leach (1–0) || Putz (1–3) || Broxton (11) || 50,761 || 21–19
|- align="center" bgcolor="bbffbb"
| 41 || May 22 || @ Red Sox || 5–3 || Santana (6–2) || Matsuzaka (0–2) || Rodríguez (12) || 38,092 || 22–19
|- align="center" bgcolor="bbffbb"
| 42 || May 23 || @ Red Sox || 3–2 || Feliciano (1–1) || Papelbon (0–1) || Putz (2) || 37,871 || 23–19
|- align="center" bgcolor="ffbbbb"
| 43 || May 24 || @ Red Sox || 12–5 || Wakefield (6–2) || Redding (0–1) || || 37,446 || 23–20
|- align="center" bgcolor="bbffbb"
| 44 || May 25 || Nationals || 5–2 || Maine (4–3) || Lannan (2–4) || Rodríguez (13) || 41,103 || 24–20
|- align="center" bgcolor="bbffbb"
| 45 || May 26 || Nationals || 6–1 || Hernández (4–1) || Stammen (0–1) || || 39,376 || 25–20
|- align="center" bgcolor="bbffbb"
| 46 || May 27 || Nationals || 7–4 || Santana (7–2) || Zimmermann (2–2) || || 40,171 || 26–20
|- align="center" bgcolor="bbffbb"
| 47 || May 29 || Marlins || 2 – 1 (11) || Feliciano (2–1) || Sanches (1–1) || || 40,677 || 27–20
|- align="center" bgcolor="ffbbbb"
| 48 || May 30 || Marlins || 7–3 || Johnson (4–1) || Redding (0–2) || Núñez (1) || 40,727 || 27–21
|- align="center" bgcolor="bbffbb"
| 49 || May 31 || Marlins || 3–2 || Maine (5–3) || Volstad (4–4) || Rodríguez (14) || 40,482 || 28–21
|-

|- bgcolor="ffbbbb"
|- align="center" bgcolor="ffbbbb"
| 50 || June 1 || @ Pirates || 8–5 || Gorzelanny (3–1) || Putz (1–4) || Capps (11) || 11,812 || 28–22
|- align="center" bgcolor="ffbbbb"
| 51 || June 2 || @ Pirates || 3–1 || Duke (6–4) || Santana (7–3) || Capps (12) || 10,459 || 28–23
|- align="center" bgcolor="bbbbbb"
| || June 3 || @ Pirates || colspan=6 |Postponed
|- align="center" bgcolor="ffbbbb"
| 52 || June 4 || @ Pirates || 11–6 || Jackson (1–0) || Pelfrey (4–2) || || 20,684 || 28–24
|- align="center" bgcolor="bbffbb"
| 53 || June 5 || @ Nationals || 3 – 1 (10) || Green (1–2) || Hanrahan (0–3) || Rodríguez (15) || 20,353 || 29–24
|- align="center" bgcolor="ffbbbb"
| 54 || June 6 || @ Nationals || 7–1 || Lannan (3–5) || Maine (5–4) || || 31,456 || 29–25
|- align="center" bgcolor="bbffbb"
| 55 || June 7 || @ Nationals || 7–0 || Hernández (5–1) || Stammen (0–2) || || 31,841 || 30–25
|- align="center" bgcolor="bbffbb"
| 56 || June 9 || Phillies || 6–5 || Santana (8–3) || Condrey (4–1) || Rodríguez (16) || 37,152 || 31–25
|- align="center" bgcolor="ffbbbb"
| 57 || June 10 || Phillies || 5 – 4 (11) || Park (2–1) || Parnell (2–1) || Madson (3) || 38,723 || 31–26
|- align="center" bgcolor="ffbbbb"
| 58 || June 11 || Phillies || 6 – 3 (10) || Eyre (1–1) || Parnell (2–2) || Madson (4) || 38,532 || 31–27
|- align="center" bgcolor="ffbbbb"
| 59 || June 12 || @ Yankees || 9–8 || Rivera (1–2) || Rodríguez (1–1) || || 47,967 || 31–28
|- align="center" bgcolor="bbffbb"
| 60 || June 13 || @ Yankees || 6–2 || Nieve (1–0) || Pettitte (6–3) || || 48,056 || 32–28
|- align="center" bgcolor="ffbbbb"
| 61 || June 14 || @ Yankees || 15–0 || Burnett (5–3) || Santana (8–4) || || 47,943 || 32–29
|- align="center" bgcolor="bbffbb"
| 62 || June 16 || @ Orioles || 6–4 || Pelfrey (5–2) || Guthrie (4–7) || Rodríguez (17) || 20,626 || 33–29
|- align="center" bgcolor="ffbbbb"
| 63 || June 17 || @ Orioles || 6–4 || Johnson (3–3) || Feliciano (2–2) || Sherrill (13) || 31,906 || 33–30
|- align="center" bgcolor="ffbbbb"
| 64 || June 18 || @ Orioles || 5–4 || Albers (1–2) || Rodríguez (1–2) || || 23,009 ||33–31
|- align="center" bgcolor="bbffbb"
| 65 || June 19 || Rays || 5–3 || Nieve (2–0)|| Sonnanstine (5–7)|| Rodríguez (18)|| 38,493 || 34–31
|- align="center" bgcolor="ffbbbb"
| 66 || June 20 || Rays || 3–1 || Shields (6–5) || Santana (8–5) || Howel (4) || 37,992 || 34–32
|- align="center" bgcolor="ffbbbb"
| 67 || June 21 || Rays || 10–6 ||Nelson (2–0)  ||Parnell (2–3) || || 38,791 || 34–33
|- align="center" bgcolor="bbffbb"
| 68 || June 22 || Cardinals || 6–4 || Redding (1–2) || Wellemeyer (6–7) || Rodríguez (19) || 38,488 || 35–33
|- align="center" bgcolor="ffbbbb"
| 69 || June 23 || Cardinals || 3–0 || Piñeiro (6–8) || Hernández (5–2) || || 38,903 || 35–34
|- align="center" bgcolor="bbffbb"
| 70 || June 24 || Cardinals || 11–0 || Nieve (3–0) || Thompson (2–3) || || 39,689 || 36–34
|- align="center" bgcolor="bbffbb"
| 71 || June 25 || Cardinals || 3–2 || Santana (9–5) || Carpenter (5–2) || Rodríguez (20) || 41,221 || 37–34
|- align="center" bgcolor="ffbbbb"
| 72 || June 26 || Yankees || 9–1 || Sabathia (7–4) || Pelfrey (5–3) || || 41,278 || 37–35
|- align="center" bgcolor="ffbbbb"
| 73 || June 27 || Yankees || 5–0 || Burnett (6–4) || Redding (1–3) || || 41,302 || 37–36
|- align="center" bgcolor="ffbbbb"
| 74 || June 28 || Yankees || 4–2 || Wang (1–6) || Hernández (5–3) || Rivera (18) || 41,315 || 37–37
|- align="center" bgcolor="ffbbbb"
| 75 || June 29 || @ Brewers || 10–6 || Looper (6–4) || Nieve (3–1) || Hoffman (18) || 39,872 || 37–38
|- align="center" bgcolor="ffbbbb"
| 76 || June 30 || @ Brewers || 6–3 || Burns (1–1) || Santana (9–6) || || 35,369 || 37–39
|-

|- bgcolor="ffbbbb"
|- align="center" bgcolor="bbffbb"
| 77 || July 1 || @ Brewers || 1–0 || Pelfrey (6–3) || Gallardo (8–5) || Rodríguez (21) || 35,409 || 38–39
|- align="center" bgcolor="bbffbb"
| 78 || July 2 || @ Pirates || 9 – 8 (10) || Rodríguez (2–2) || Capps (1–4) || || 14,321 || 39–39
|- align="center" bgcolor="ffbbbb"
| 79 || July 3 || @ Phillies || 7–2 || López (1–0) || Hernández (5–4) || || 45,231 || 39–40
|- align="center" bgcolor="ffbbbb"
| 80 || July 4 || @ Phillies || 4–1 || Moyer (7–6)|| Nieve (3–2) || Lidge (15) || 45,141 || 39–41
|- align="center" bgcolor="ffbbbb"
| 81 || July 5 || @ Phillies || 2–0 || Blanton (5–4) || Santana (9–7) || Lidge (16) || 45,333 || 39–42
|- align="center" bgcolor="ffbbbb"
| 82 || July 7 || Dodgers || 8–0 || Kershaw (6–5) || Pelfrey (6–4) || || 39,696 || 39–43
|- align="center" bgcolor="bbffbb"
| 83 || July 8 || Dodgers || 5–4 || Pérez (2–2) || Kuroda (3–5) || Rodríguez (22) || 40,027 || 40–43
|- align="center" bgcolor="ffbbbb"
| 84 || July 9 || Dodgers || 11–2 || Wolf (4–3) || Hernández (5–5) || || 39,865 || 40–44
|- align="center" bgcolor="ffbbbb"
| 85 || July 10 || Reds || 3–0 || Arroyo (9–8) || Nieve (3–3) || || 39,203 || 40–45
|- align="center" bgcolor="bbffbb"
| 86 || July 11 || Reds || 4–0 || Santana (10–7) || Cueto (8–6) || || 39,396 || 41–45
|- align="center" bgcolor="bbffbb"
| 87 || July 12 || Reds || 9–7 || Pelfrey (7–4) || Harang (5–9) || Rodríguez (23) || 40,014 || 42–45
|- align="center" bgcolor="ffbbbb"
| 88 || July 16 || @ Braves || 5–3 || Acosta (1–0) || Feliciano (2–3) || Soriano (13) || 32,736 || 42–46
|- align="center" bgcolor="ffbbbb"
| 89 || July 17 || @ Braves || 11–0 || Jurrjens (8–7) || Pelfrey (7–5) || || 50,704 || 42–47
|- align="center" bgcolor="bbffbb"
| 90 || July 18 || @ Braves || 5–1 || Santana (11–7) || Kawakami (5–7) || || 51,175 || 43–47
|- align="center" bgcolor="ffbbbb"
| 91 || July 19 || @ Braves || 7–1 || Vasquez (7–7) || Redding (1–4) || || 34,923 || 43–48
|- align="center" bgcolor="bbffbb"
| 92 || July 20 || @ Nationals || 6–2 || Hernández (6–5) || Martin (0–1) || || 19,169 || 44–48
|- align="center" bgcolor="ffbbbb"
| 93 || July 21 || @ Nationals || 4–0 || Lannan (7–7) || Pérez (2–2) || || 23,414 || 44–49
|- align="center" bgcolor="ffbbbb"
| 94 || July 22 || @ Nationals || 3–1 || Stammen (3–5) || Pelfrey (7–6) || MacDougal (6) || 23,583 || 44–50
|- align="center" bgcolor="ffbbbb"
| 95 || July 24 || @ Astros || 4–5 || Hampton (6–7) || Santana (11–8) || Valverde (11) ||42,967 || 44–51
|- align="center" bgcolor="bbffbb"
| 96 || July 25 || @ Astros || 10–3 || Niese (1–0) || Ortiz (3–5) || || 43,302 || 45–51
|- align="center" bgcolor="bbffbb"
| 97 || July 26 || @ Astros || 8–3 || Hernández (7–5) || Moehler (7–6) || Green (1) || 34,642 || 46–51
|- align="center" bgcolor="bbffbb"
| 98 || July 27 || Rockies || 7–3 || Feliciano (3–3) || Rincón (3–2) || || 38,936 || 47–51
|- align="center" bgcolor="bbffbb"
| 99 || July 28 || Rockies || 4–0 || Pelfrey (8–6) || Marquis (12–7) || || 39,126 || 48–51
|- align="center" bgcolor="bbbbbb"
| || July 29 || Rockies || colspan=6 |Postponed
|- align="center" bgcolor="bbffbb"
| 100 || July 30 || Rockies || 7–0 || Santana (12–8) || Hammel (5–6) || || 40,024 || 49–51
|- align="center" bgcolor="ffbbbb"
| 101 || July 30 || Rockies || 4–2 || de la Rosa (9–7) || Niese (1–1) || Street (26) || 38,962 || 49–52
|- align="center" bgcolor="ffbbbb"
| 102 || July 31 || Diamondbacks || 3–2 || Vásquez (2–2) || Green (1–3) || Qualls (19) || 38,241 || 49–53
|-

|- bgcolor="ffbbbb"
|- align="center" bgcolor="bbffbb"
| 103 || August 1 || Diamondbacks || 9–6 || Feliciano (4–3) || Zavada (2–3) || Rodríguez (24) || 39,574 || 50–53
|- align="center" bgcolor="ffbbbb"
| 104 || August 2 || Diamondbacks || 5–2 || Garland (6–10) || Pelfrey (8–7) || || 38,374 || 50–54
|- align="center" bgcolor="ffbbbb"
| 105 || August 3 || Diamondbacks || 6–5 || Haren (11–6) || Figueroa (0–2) || Qualls (20) || 39,320 || 50–55
|- align="center" bgcolor="ffbbbb"
| 106 || August 4 || Cardinals || 12 – 7 (10) || McClellan (3–2) || Feliciano (4–4) || || 40,354 || 50–56
|- align="center" bgcolor="bbffbb"
| 107 || August 5 || Cardinals || 9–0 || Figueroa (1–2) || Lohse (4–7) || Parnell (1) || 39,781 || 51–56
|- align="center" bgcolor="ffbbbb"
| 108 || August 6 || @ Padres || 8–3 || Richard (5–3) || Hernández (7–6) || || 18,880 || 51–57
|- align="center" bgcolor="ffbbbb"
| 109 || August 7 || @ Padres || 6–2 || Bell (4–1) || Rodríguez (2–3) || || 23,038 || 51–58
|- align="center" bgcolor="ffbbbb"
| 110 || August 8 || @ Padres || 3–1 || Latos (4–1) || Parnell (2–4) || Bell (28) || 35,184 || 51–59
|- align="center" bgcolor="bbffbb"
| 111 || August 9 || @ Padres || 5–1 || Santana (13–8) || Stauffer (1–4) || || 27,754 || 52–59
|- align="center" bgcolor="ffbbbb"
| 112 || August 10 || @ Diamondbacks || 7–4 || Davis (7–10) || Pelfrey (8–8) || || 23,069 || 52–60
|- align="center" bgcolor="ffbbbb"
| 113 || August 11 || @ Diamondbacks || 6–2 || Scherzer (7–6) || Hernández (7–7) || || 24,576 || 52–61
|- align="center" bgcolor="bbffbb"
| 114 || August 12 || @ Diamondbacks || 6–4 || Feliciano (5–4) || Rauch (2–1) || Rodríguez (25) || 22,320 || 53–61
|- align="center" bgcolor="bbffbb"
| 115 || August 14 || Giants || 3–0 || Parnell (3–4) || Zito (8–11) || Rodríguez (26) || 38,997 || 54–61
|- align="center" bgcolor="ffbbbb"
| 116 || August 15 || Giants || 5–4 (10) || Wilson (5–5) || Rodríguez (2–4) || || 39,652 || 54–62
|- align="center" bgcolor="bbffbb"
| 117 || August 16 || Giants || 3–2 || Rodríguez (3–4) || Romo (3–2) || || 38,793 || 55–62
|- align="center" bgcolor="ffbbbb"
| 118 || August 17 || Giants || 10–1 || Martinez (3–1) || Hernández (7–8) || || 38,584 || 55–63
|- align="center" bgcolor="bbffbb"
| 119 || August 18 || Braves || 9–4 || Pérez (3–3) || Lowe (12–8) || || 38,613 || 56–63
|- align="center" bgcolor="ffbbbb"
| 120 || August 19 || Braves || 14–2 || Jurrjens (10–8) || Parnell (3–5) || || 38,602 || 56–64
|- align="center" bgcolor="ffbbbb"
| 121 || August 20 || Braves ||3–2 || Kawakami (6–9) || Santana (13–9) || Soriano (18) || 39,105 || 56–65
|- align="center" bgcolor="bbffbb"
| 122 || August 21 || Phillies || 2–4 || Pelfrey (9–8) || Hamels (7–8) || Rodríguez (27) || 38,243 || 57–65
|- align="center" bgcolor="ffbbbb"
| 123 || August 22 || Phillies || 4–1 || Happ (10–2) || Misch (0–1) || Lidge (24) || 38,049 || 57–66
|- align="center" bgcolor="ffbbbb"
| 124 || August 23 || Phillies || 9–7 || Martínez (2–0) || Pérez (3–4) || Lidge (25) || 39,038 || 57–67
|- align="center" bgcolor="ffbbbb"
| 125 || August 24 || Phillies || 6–2 || Lee (5–0) || Parnell (3–6) || || 39,336 || 57–68
|- align="center" bgcolor="ffbbbb"
| 126 || August 25 || @ Marlins || 2–1 || West (5–5) || Figueroa (1–3) || Núñez (15) || 14,278 || 57–69
|- align="center" bgcolor="ffbbbb"
| 127 || August 26 || @ Marlins || 5–3 || Johnson (13–3) || Pelfrey (9–9) || Núñez (16) || 16,123 || 57–70
|- align="center" bgcolor="bbffbb"
| 128 || August 27 || @ Marlins || 10–3 || Redding (2–4) || Sánchez (2–5) || || 12,423 || 58–70
|- align="center" bgcolor="ffbbbb"
| 129 || August 28 || @ Cubs || 5–2 || Gregg (5–5) || Stokes (1–3) || Mármol (6) || 39,381 || 58–71
|- align="center" bgcolor="ffbbbb"
| 130 || August 29 || @ Cubs || 11–4 || Dempster (8–7) || Parnell (3–7) || || 40,857 || 58–72
|- align="center" bgcolor="bbffbb"
| 131 || August 30 || @ Cubs || 4–1 || Figueroa (2–3) || Zambrano (7–6) || Rodríguez (28) || 39,907 || 59–72
|-

|- bgcolor="ffbbbb"
|- align="center" bgcolor="ffbbbb"
| 132 || September 1 || @ Rockies || 8–3 || de la Rosa (13–9) || Pelfrey (9–10) || ||26,190 || 59–73
|- align="center" bgcolor="ffbbbb"
| 133 || September 2 || @ Rockies || 5–2 || Jiménez (13–10) || Stokes (1–4) || Morales (1) || 26,276  || 59–74
|- align="center" bgcolor="bbffbb"
| 134 || September 3 || @ Rockies || 8–3  || Misch (1–1) || Marquis (14–10) || || 22,566  || 60–74
|- align="center" bgcolor="bbffbb"
| 135 || September 4 || Cubs || 6–2 || Stokes (2–4) || Gregg (5–6) || Rodríguez (29) || 37,953 || 61–74
|- align="center" bgcolor="ffbbbb"
| 136 || September 5 || Cubs || 5–3  || Harden (9–8) || Figueroa (2–4) || Mármol (9) || 38,759 || 61–75
|- align="center" bgcolor="bbffbb"
| 137 || September 6 || Cubs || 4–2 || Pelfrey (10–10) || Wells (10–8)  || Rodríguez (30) ||39,593 || 62–75
|- align="center" bgcolor="ffbbbb"
| 138 || September 8 || Marlins || 4–2 || Sanches (4–1) || Redding (2–5) || Núñez (19) || 37,474 || 62–76
|- align="center" bgcolor="ffbbbb"
| 139 || September 9 || Marlins || 6–3 || Nolasco (11–8) || Misch (1–2)  || Núñez (20) || 37,312 || 62–77
|- align="center" bgcolor="ffbbbb"
| 140 || September 10 || Marlins || 13–4 || Badenhop (7–4) || Parnell (3–8) || || 37,620 || 62–78
|- align="center" bgcolor="ffbbbb"
| 141 || September 11 || @ Phillies || 4–2 || Hamels (9–9)  || Figueroa (2–5)  || Madson (7) || 44,377 || 62–79
|- align="center" bgcolor="bbffbb"
| 142 || September 12 || @ Phillies || 10–9 || Feliciano (6–4) || Madson (5–5)  || Rodríguez (31) || 45,243 || 63–79
|- align="center" bgcolor="ffbbbb"
| 143 || September 13 || @ Phillies || 5–4 || Kendrick (1–1) || Maine (5–5) || Lidge (29) || 45,024 || 63–80
|- align="center" bgcolor="ffbbbb"
| 144 || September 13 || @ Phillies || 1–0 || Martínez (5–0) || Redding (2–6)  || Madson (8) || 44,901 || 63–81
|- align="center" bgcolor="ffbbbb"
| 145 || September 15 || @ Braves || 6–0 || Hanson (10–3) || Misch (1–3) || || 25,094 || 63–82
|- align="center" bgcolor="ffbbbb"
| 146 || September 16 || @ Braves || 6–5 || O'Flaherty (2–1) || Rodríguez (3–5) || || 17,988 || 63–83
|- align="center" bgcolor="ffbbbb"
| 147 || September 17 || @ Braves || 7–3 || Jurrjens (12–10) || Figueroa (2–6) || || 20,192 || 63–84
|- align="center" bgcolor="ffbbbb"
| 148 || September 18 || Nationals || 6–5 || Martin (5–4) || Pelfrey (10–11) || MacDougal (16) || 38,063 || 63–85
|- align="center" bgcolor="bbffbb"
| 149 || September 19 || Nationals || 3–2 || Redding (3–6) || Lannan (9–12) || Rodríguez (32) || 37,906 || 64–85
|- align="center" bgcolor="bbffbb"
| 150 || September 20 || Nationals || 6–2 || Maine (6–5) || Mock (3–9) || Rodríguez (33) || 38,347 || 65–85
|- align="center" bgcolor="ffbbbb"
| 151 || September 21 || Braves || 11–3 || Lowe (15–9) || Misch (1–4) || Kawakami (1) || 37,706 || 65–86
|- align="center" bgcolor="ffbbbb"
| 152 || September 22 || Braves || 3–1 || Jurrjens (13–10) || Figueroa (2–7) || Soriano (25) || 37,823 || 65–87
|- align="center" bgcolor="ffbbbb"
| 153 || September 23 || Braves || 5–2 || Hudson (2–1)|| Pelfrey (10–12) || Soriano (26) || 38,266 || 65–88
|- align="center" bgcolor="bbffbb"
| 154 || September 25 || @ Marlins || 6–5 || Parnell (4–8) || Núñez (4–6) || Rodríguez (34) || 39,031 || 66–88
|- align="center" bgcolor="ffbbbb"
| 155 || September 26 || @ Marlins || 9–6 || West (8–6) || Maine (6–6) || Donnelly (1) || 35,666 || 66–89
|- align="center" bgcolor="bbffbb"
| 156 || September 27 || @ Marlins || 4–0 || Misch (2–4) || Volstad (9–13) || || 31,167 || 67–89
|- align="center" bgcolor="ffbbbb"
| 157 || September 28 || @ Nationals || 2–1 || Detwiler (1–6) || Figueroa (2–8) || MacDougal (17) || 18,600 || 67–90
|- align="center" bgcolor="ffbbbb"
| 158 || September 29 || @ Nationals || 4–3 || Clippard (3–2) || Green (1–4) || MacDougal (18) || 19,614 || 67–91
|- align="center" bgcolor="ffbbbb"
| 159 || September 30 || @ Nationals || 7–4 || Villone (5–6) || Rodríguez (3–6) || || 23,944 || 67–92
|-

|- bgcolor="ffbbbb"
|- align="center" bgcolor="bbffbb"
| 160 || October 2 || Astros || 7–1 || Maine (7–6) || Rodríguez (14–12) || || 37,576 || 68–92
|- align="center" bgcolor="bbffbb"
| 161 || October 3 || Astros || 5–1 || Misch (3–4) || Bazardo (1–3) || Rodríguez (35) || 37,578 || 69–92
|- align="center" bgcolor="bbffbb"
| 162 || October 4 || Astros || 4–0 || Figueroa (3–8) || López (0–2) || || 38,135 || 70–92
|-

Player stats

Batting
Legend: G = Games played; AB = At-bats; H = Hits; BA = Batting average; OBP = On-base percentage; HR = Home runs; RBI = Runs batted in; R = Runs scored; SB = Stolen bases

Pitching
Legend: G = Games pitched; GS = Games started; IP = Innings pitched; W = Wins; L = Losses; S = Saves; ERA = Earned run average; H = Hits allowed; SO = Strikeouts; BB = Walks; bold = league leader

All stats as of October 4, 2009

Farm system

References

External links

2009 New York Mets season Official Site
2009 New York Mets season at Baseball Reference

New York Mets seasons
New York Mets season
New York Mets
2000s in Queens
Flushing, Queens